Mount Zulia  (or Losolia) is in the Karamoja region in the north-east of Uganda in the Kidepo Valley National Park.

The Toposa people of Eastern Equatoria say that they originated in the Losolia Mountains, moving away during a severe drought that killed both people and animals.
The forests of the mountain are partly protected by the Mount Zulia Forest Reserve.

References

Zulia